Light Snow may refer to:

The Makioka Sisters, a 1943 novel by Jun'ichirō Tanizaki
Xiaoxue, the 20th solar term